George Burrell Ramsay (4 March 1855 – 7 October 1935) was a Scottish footballer and manager.

Ramsay was the secretary and manager of Aston Villa Football Club during the club's 'Golden Age'. As a player he was the first Aston Villa captain to lift a trophy, being instrumental in establishing the club as force in the game. A pioneer of the passing game, which he learned in his native Scotland, Aston Villa became renowned for their short, quick combination passing under his leadership. 

His trophy haul of six League Championships and six FA Cups established Aston Villa as the most successful club in England. He has been described as the world's first paid football manager.  To this day, Ramsay remains one of the most successful managers in the history of English football.

Early life
Ramsay was born at Abbotsford Place in the Tradeston district of Glasgow. His father was William Ramsay, an ironmonger, who originated from Perthshire.  George's mother was Mary Ann Burrell who was born in Woolwich. The Glaswegian arrived in Birmingham  to work as a clerk in a brass foundry.

Playing career

Prior to joining Aston Villa, Ramsay had played for Glasgow Rovers. In 1877 he appeared as a guest player for Welsh club Druids, when they played a fixture against Queens Park.

Ramsay came to join Aston Villa almost by accident. Walking past a Villa players' practice match in Aston Park in 1876, he was asked to make up the numbers. They were amazed by his skills, they had never seen a display of close ball control before. When the game was over, the Villa players surrounded him and invited him to join the club, and very soon he became captain. Ramsay later described the newly formed club's approach to the game as 'a dash at the man and a big kick at the ball'. Word spread about how fine a player Ramsay was, spectators began turning up to watch the little man nicknamed 'Scotty'. He also took charge of training which saw dramatic improvement that showed in the results, introducing what was known as the "passing game". This had become the main style of play in Scotland whereas in England most teams relied on what was known as the "dribbling game".

 

In addition to the introduction of a radical change in playing style, Ramsay, along with John Linsay, discovered the Wellington Road ground at Perry Barr in 1876, which meant the club was able to charge admission for the first time. He was also responsible for the recruitment of Villa legend Archie Hunter, who later recounted the story in his 1890 memoir Triumphs of the Football Field.

 

Villa gradually improved under his guidance,"the influence of Ramsay, then Hunter, led Villa to develop an intricate passing game, a revolutionary move for an English club in the late 1870s. It was a style of play modelled on that which was prevalent in Scotland at the time and which had been pioneered by Queen's Park, the Glasgow side. This type of sophisticated teamwork had rarely been employed in England." Villa were becoming a force to be reckoned with in the Midlands, which culminated in the club winning their first trophy, The Birmingham Senior Cup, in 1880, with Ramsay as captain. The club would go on to lift the trophy 9 times in the next 12 seasons. William McGregor later recalled:  

Ramsay retired from playing due to a knee injury sustained during a match against Nottingham Forest in June 1882. He handed the captaincy to fellow Scotsman, Archie Hunter, but remained involved with the club serving on the committee.

Management career

Following the professionalisation of football in 1885, the club decided that it needed a full-time paid manager. The following advert was placed in the Birmingham Daily Gazette newspaper in June 1886:

 Villa received 150 applicants for the role, but with his strong association with the club George Ramsay was the overwhelming choice of the membership. Thus on 26 June 1886, Villa appointed what has been described as the world's first football manager. The position predates the modern role of a football manager, the advert used the title 'manager' but the club settled on the title of 'secretary'. Ramsay was responsible for the team, including controlling recruitment and transfers, supported by a specialist trainer, who from 1893 until 1915 was Joe Grierson. The team was selected by the committee each week, which consisted of such figures as William McGregor, Fred Rinder and, following their retirement, former club captains John Devey and Howard Spencer. 

He held his position at the club for a remarkable 42 years, in which time Villa won the Football League and FA Cup 6 times each, establishing themselves as the premier football club in England. Villa's style of play under Ramsay consisted of high speed dribbling, short passes and powerful shooting.

The Villa News remarked in October 1935 that: "He was not content that Aston Villa should be noted just in the playing sense; his demand was that it should become an institution with a world-wide reputation for probity in sportsmanship".

Ramsay later said of his role in the establishment of Aston Villa as the most successful football club in England: "I have sewn an acorn and caused an oak tree to grow."

In 1926, at the age of 71, Ramsay retired as secretary and became honorary advisor and a vice-president of the Club. His replacement W. J. Smith was unable to continue Ramsay's success, although the club did finish runners-up in the league twice under his guidance. In 1934 Smith stood down and the club decided to appoint its first manager, Jimmy McMullan. The following year Ramsay died at the age of 80. Within a year of his death the Midlands giants were relegated, an unthinkable notion in the Ramsay era.

In all, Ramsay's association with the football club lasted 59 years, a time which will always be known as Aston Villa's 'Golden Age'. Ramsay was laid to rest at St. Mary's Church, Handsworth, his gravestone reads "Founder of Aston Villa".

He was inducted into the inaugural Aston Villa Hall of Fame in 2006.

Personal life
He married Fanny Elizabeth Warwick, an Aston girl, in 1893. They had two sons and one daughter. Ramsay divorced his wife on the grounds of her adultery in 1915.

Honours
Aston Villa
First Division Champions (6): 1893–94, 1895–96, 1896–97, 1898–99, 1899–1900, 1909–10
 Runners up (6): 1889, 1903, 1908, 1911, 1913, 1914

FA Cup Winners (6): 1886–87, 1894–95, 1896–97, 1904–05, 1912–13, 1919–20
 Runners up (2): 1892, 1924
Sheriff of London Charity Shield (2): 1899 (shared), 1901

Ramsay was awarded two long service medals by the Football League, his first in 1909 and his second in 1927.

See also 
 List of English football championship winning managers

References

1855 births
1935 deaths
Aston Villa F.C. managers
Aston Villa F.C. players
Footballers from Glasgow
Scottish football managers
19th-century Scottish people
Scottish footballers
Association football forwards
People from Gorbals
English Football League managers